San Marino elects on the national level a legislature. The Grand and General Council (Consiglio Grande e Generale) has 60 members, elected for a five-year term by semi-proportional representation with national majority bonus (the winning coalition receives at least 35 seats on 60).

San Marino has a multi-party system, with numerous parties in which no one party often has a chance of gaining power alone, and parties must work with each other to form coalition governments.

The first elections were held in March 1906 after the Arengo held on the same year that established democracy in the country. Between 1926 and 1943, the Sammarinese Fascist Party took power and all other parties were banned. Democracy was restored in 1945.

Since early 2008, there has been an electoral threshold of 3.5%. Since 2016, if none of the coalitions achieves an absolute majority of seats, a runoff between the two largest coalitions is held.

General elections

Last election 

A parliamentary election was held in San Marino on 8 December 2019.

Election results 1945–2016

Local elections 
Local elections are held every 5 years in all the municipalities, to elect the municipal councils (giunte di castello) and the mayors (capitani di castello). The last elections were held on 30 November 2014. Proportional representation is used to allocate the seats. Voters have up to 2 preference votes.

Referendums 
Sammarinese citizenry meeting, 1906
1982 Sammarinese citizenship referendum
1996 Sammarinese electoral law referendum
1997 Sammarinese referendum
1999 Sammarinese citizenship referendum
2003 Sammarinese voting system referendum
2005 Sammarinese electoral law referendum
2008 Sammarinese referendum
2011 Sammarinese public property referendum
2013 Sammarinese referendum
2014 Sammarinese referendum
2016 Sammarinese referendum

See also
 Electoral calendar
 Electoral system
 List of political parties in San Marino

External links
Adam Carr's Election Archive
Parties and elections